Joseph Douglas Terwilliger is an American geneticist and professor of neurobiology at the Columbia University Medical Center and the New York State Psychiatric Institute. In addition to his scientific research, he is known for accompanying retired basketball player Dennis Rodman on his visits to North Korea, where he has said that he serves as Rodman's translator. He began his involvement in Rodman's trips to the country after winning a basketball game with him at an auction.

Education and career

A tuba player, Terwilliger received his bachelor's degree from the Peabody Conservatory of Music. After receiving his bachelor's, Terwilliger moved to New York City to look for a job in music, but later found himself drawn to a graduate school program in genetics and development  at Columbia University Medical Center. He later recalled, "I could not believe they were actually going to pay me to go to grad school. In music you have to teach classes just to pay your tuition, and then you have to get a job to pay the rent. While in science they actually were going to pay me, which seemed like an unbelievable scam at the time." He decided to enroll in a graduate program at Columbia in genetics because he felt that, since he had been a music major, the alternative would probably be working at McDonald's; he later discovered he had a natural interest in statistical genetics. He went on to receive his Ph.D. from the Columbia University Graduate School of Arts and Sciences in 1993. He then received a Hitchings-Elion Fellowship from the Burroughs Wellcome Fund, which he spent working with Mark Lathrop at the Wellcome Centre for Human Genetics at the University of Oxford. In July 2013, he began teaching a human evolutionary genetics class at Pyongyang University of Science and Technology (PUST) in North Korea. He still teaches at PUST as of October 2017.  He has an Erdős–Bacon number of 6, having appeared in Dennis Rodman's Big Bang in Pyongyang. He also sang additional vocals on the 2020 album Killection by Finnish heavy metal band Lordi.

References

External links
Faculty page

Living people
American geneticists
Statistical geneticists
Peabody Institute alumni
Columbia University Vagelos College of Physicians and Surgeons alumni
Human geneticists
Columbia University faculty
American tubists
21st-century tubists
Year of birth missing (living people)